In the Republic of India, the various central and state legislatures are presided by either a Speaker or a Chairman. The Speaker is elected in the very first meeting of the Punjab Legislative Assembly after the General elections for a term of 5 years from amongst the members of the Vidhan Sabha. The Speaker holds office until either he ceases to be a member of the Vidhan Sabha or he himself resigns. The Speaker can be removed from office by a resolution passed in the Vidhan Sabha by an effective majority of its members. In the absence of a Speaker, the meeting of Punjab Legislative Assembly is presided over by the Deputy Speaker. The incumbent Speaker is Rana Kanwar Pal Singh and the deputy speaker is Ajaib Singh Bhatti of Indian National Congress.

Powers and functions of the Speaker
Following are the functions and position of Speakers.

The Speaker of the Vidhan Sabha conducts the business in house, and decides whether a bill is a money bill or not. 
They maintain discipline and decorum in the house and can punish a member for their unruly behaviour by suspending them. 
They also permit the moving of various kinds of motions and resolutions such as a motion of no confidence, motion of adjournment, motion of censure and calling attention notice as per the rules. 
The speaker decides on the agenda to be taken up for discussion during the meeting. 
The date of election of the speaker is fixed by the Governor of Punjab. Further, all comments and speeches made by members of the House are addressed to the speaker.
The speaker is answerable to the house. 
Both the speaker and deputy speaker may be removed by a resolution passed by the majority of the members. 
Speaker also gives recognition to the main opposite party as an Official Opposition and to the leader of that party in assembly as the Leader of Opposition.

Speaker

Deputy Speaker
The Deputy Speaker is the vice-presiding officer of the Vidhan Sabha. Acts as the presiding officer in case of leave or absence caused by death or illness of the Speaker.

List of Deputy Speakers 
Color keys for the Party of Deputy Speaker

Pro tem Speaker
After a general election and the formation of a new government, a list of senior Members in Vidhan Sabha prepared by the Legislative Section is submitted to the Minister of Parliamentary Affairs, who selects a pro tem speaker who holds the office of Speaker until a full time speaker is elected. However,, in Punjab mostly the pro tem speaker become the full time Speaker. The appointment has to be approved by the Governor.

The first meeting after the election when the speaker and the deputy speaker are selected by members of the Vidhan Sabha is held under the pro tem Speaker. In the absence of the speaker, the deputy speaker acts as speaker. In the absence of both, a committee of six members selected by the speaker will act as speaker according to their seniority.

The Speaker of the Assembly must:

 Be a citizen of India;
 Not be less than 25 years of age; and
 Not hold any office of profit under the Government of Punjab, India.

In Punjab Legislative Assembly mostly Pro-tem speaker is elected as Speaker.

List of Pro tem Speakers

References

Lists of legislative speakers in India
Speakers of the Punjab Legislative Assembly
Lists of people from Punjab, India